The Gumelniţa culture was a Chalcolithic culture of the 5th millennium BC (c. 4700–4000 BC), named after the Gumelniţa site on the left (Romanian) bank of the Danube.

Geography

The Gumelniţa culture was part of the broader Gumelniţa-Kodžadermen-Karanovo VI complex. This evolved out of the earlier Boian, and Karanovo V cultures. Gumelniţa-Kodžadermen-Karanovo VI is also aggregated with the Varna culture. The Gumelniţa culture was supplanted by the Cernavodă culture in the early 4th millennium BC.

Periodization
"One of the most flourishing civilizations from the last half of the 5th millenium BC is (next to the Ariuşd Cucuteni – Tripolie complex) Gumelniţa Culture... absolute chronology, still under discussion, according to the latest calibrated data, assigns this culture (as mentioned above) to the limits of the last half of the 5th millenium BC and maybe to early 4th millenium BC." — Silvia Marinescu-Bîlcu, Gumelniţa Culture.

This matches exactly the view of Blagoje Govedarica (2004).

The first periodization of Gumelniţa culture was suggested by VI. Dumitrescu who split the civilization of Gumelniţa into two phases: A and B. Later on, Dinu V. Rosetti divided the civilization into Al, A2 and B1, B2.

Gumelniţa A
With a centric evolution from geographic point of view, the intensity of the cultural trends decreased from the center towards peripheral area. Having a strong Boian background at the origins, mixed with Maritza elements, the Gumelniţa culture lasted short of a millennium from the beginning of the Chalcolithic to the start of the fourth millennium BC.

Gumelniţa A1
4700–4350.

Gumelniţa A2
4500–3950. The regional characteristics of A1 phase are diminished, and more uniform characteristics are identified in discovered artifacts.

Synchronisms

Art
The Gumelniţa is remarkable by the richness of its anthropomorphic and zoomorphic representations. Some consider the achievements of prehistoric craftsmen to be true masterpieces.

The representation from Gumelnița art differ by other cultures by the following:
statuettes morphology characterised by expressivity, gesture and attitude.
modelling technique
arms positions on the belly, stretched laterally, in the position of the "thinker"
sex representation
decoration pattern

Seashell ornament is relatively common. At least some of the shellfish used come from the Aegean regions, for example the spondylas and the dentals.

As evidence from archaeology, thousands of artifacts from Neolithic Europe have been discovered, mostly in the form of female figurines. As a result a 'mother goddess' theory was proposed. The leading proponent was the archaeologist Marija Gimbutas. This interpretation is still a subject of great controversy in archaeology due to Gimbutas' many inferences about the symbols on artifacts.

The analysis of the finds uncovered by archaeological excavations revealed a few characteristics of the Gumelniţa objects of art, likely to lead to a few main trends of the spiritual life investigation.

"The prevalence of a female character is clear, as it represents 34% of all the anthropomorphic representations. That might represent a deity, the term having a general significance, of worship, without being able to specify under the current stage of the researches which is the nature and status of this deity. The male representations are very few, about 1%, while about 10% are the asexual representations, therefore with no sign (breasts, sexual triangle) which might point to the sex of the statuette." — Gumelniţa Anthropomorphic and Zoomorphic Objects of Art by Radian Romus Andreescu.

Gallery

Technological developments
Gumelniţa culture has some sign of work specialisation:

"We do not have enough data on the internal organization of the community, but next to the dwellings themselves, arranged or not in a certain order, we encounter workshop-dwellings for processing lithic material, bones, horns, ornaments, statuettes, etc.)." — Gumelniţa Culture by Silvia Marinescu-Bîlcu

Danube Script
During the Middle Copper Age, the Danube script appears in three horizons: The Gumelniţa–Kodžadermen-Karanovo VI cultural complex (mainly in Bulgaria, but also in Romania), the Cucuteni A3-A4–Trypillya B (in Ukraine), and Coțofeni I (in Serbia). The first, rates 68.6% of the frequencies; the second, rates 24.2%; and the third, rates 7.6%.

See also
Old Europe
Vinča culture
Tărtăria tablets
Vinča symbols
Sesklo culture
Cucuteni–Trypillia culture
Hamangia culture
Butmir Culture
Tisza culture
Linear Pottery culture
Lengyel culture
Funnelbeaker culture

References

Bibliography
Stefan Hiller, Vassil Nikolov (eds.), Karanovo III. Beiträge zum Neolithikum in Südosteuropa Österreichisch-Bulgarische Ausgrabungen und Forschungen in Karanovo, Band III, Vienna (2000), .

External links

Gumelnița culture museum
Brukenthalmuseum.ro
Civa.uv.ro
Civa.uv.ro
Bulgariatravel.org
Worldmuseumofman.org
Culture.gouv.fr
Cimec.ro
Cimec.ro
Arheologie.ulbsibiu.ro
 
Institute for the Study of the Ancient World

Archaeological cultures of Southeastern Europe
Neolithic cultures of Europe
Archaeological cultures in Bulgaria
Archaeological cultures in Greece
Archaeological cultures in Moldova
Archaeological cultures in Romania
5th millennium BC